Rodolfo Padron (5 November 1927 – 29 May 2007) was a Venezuelan wrestler. He competed in the men's freestyle light heavyweight at the 1952 Summer Olympics.

References

External links
 

1927 births
2007 deaths
Venezuelan male sport wrestlers
Olympic wrestlers of Venezuela
Wrestlers at the 1952 Summer Olympics
Pan American Games medalists in wrestling
Pan American Games bronze medalists for Venezuela
Wrestlers at the 1959 Pan American Games
20th-century Venezuelan people
21st-century Venezuelan people